Michael Lally may refer to:

 Mícheál Lally (born 1939), Irish writer and historian
 Michael Lally (brigadier-general) (1714–1773), Irish soldier
 Michael Lally (poet) (born 1942), American-born poet and author
 Mike Lally, American college football player
 Mick Lally, Irish actor